Brian Oliver (born January 29, 1971) is an American film producer, film executive and founder of New Republic Pictures. He was nominated for an Academy Award and BAFTA Film Award in 2010 for Black Swan.

Education
Oliver holds a bachelor's degree from the UC Berkeley, as well as a J.D. from Whittier College School of Law. While at UC Berkeley, Oliver was an All-Conference infielder on the baseball team.

Career
Oliver has produced films that include Black Swan, The Ides of March, The Woman in Black, Rush, A Walk Among the Tombstones, and Everest.  He was nominated for Academy Award for Best Picture for Black Swan at the 83rd Academy Awards and won the Best Feature Film Award at the 26th Independent Spirit Awards.  He has also been nominated for Golden Globes for Black Swan, Ides of March, and Rush;  a BAFTA for Black Swan; and Producers Guild of America's "Producer of the Year" awards in 2011 and 2012.

In March 2017, Oliver and Filmula's Johnny Lin acquired rights to the sci-fi project Rise. In September 2017, Oliver and Lin announced production of the horror film Sacrifice.

Filmography 
He was a producer in all films unless otherwise noted.

Film

Television

References

Further reading 
 
 
https://www.hollywoodreporter.com/lists/oscars-battle-billionaires-meet-6-933210

External links 
 
 
 Fandango

1971 births
Film producers from California
Living people
People from San Francisco